MidwayUSA is a privately held American retailer of various hunting and outdoor-related products. The company is headquartered in Columbia, Missouri, and sells in the continental United States. The company markets online.

History

Ely Arms, Inc., the original name of MidwayUSA, was a small start-up gun shop in Columbia, Missouri – opening on June 18, 1977.  Larry Potterfield, with his next younger brother Jerry, opened the business in a  metal, pole-frame building.  Jerry sold his half interest to Larry in 1980 and returned home to farm.

The mail-order division was started quite modestly later in 1977, with a small offering of ‘hand-made’ 8mm Japanese pistol ammunition and 25 Remington rifle ammunition.  In 1980 Midway received the first shipment of what was to be a total production run of 500,000 rounds of 8mm Nambu brass, produced by B.E.L.L. Labs of Chicago.   Much of this brass was loaded into ammunition and can still be found at gun shows in a bright orange box.  The first press releases were under the name Ely Arms, Inc., which turned out to be in conflict with the Eley Division of Kynoch Industry; the term Eley was trademarked.  So the name Ely Arms, Inc. was changed to Midway Arms, Inc., to avoid the conflict.  The name Midway comes from the small community of Midway, in which the business was originally located.  The name MidwayUSA was adopted as a dba in April 1998.  Starline Brass was just starting up in the mid-1970s and MidwayUSA became their first distributor of bulk pistol brass, and in turn, the grandfather of the bulk components business in the United States.  Winchester began selling bulk components to MidwayUSA in 1984 and Remington came on board in 1987.  The Volker-McClure act was passed in 1986, modifying the 1968 Gun Control Act to allow the sale of cartridge cases directly to the end consumer and MidwayUSA immediately changed their model from business to FFL, to also include business to consumer.

In 1987 Midway USA began adding other reloading products, the first of which was Lee Precision. 

Computerization played a major role in the development of MidwayUSA; Potterfield had one computer class in college, and in 1982 he purchased the Company's first computer, an Apple III. In 1986 he bought the first IBM; in March 1987 they began networking their computers together.   All of this is the basis for the Information System and Website Management Departments at MidwayUSA today.

In 2014 MidwayUSA became an online-only retailer moving away from mail orders and the master catalog upon which the company was built.

Modern Management Practices
MidwayUSA is a proponent of the use of Modern Management Practices in business management.  Modern Management Practices include Baldrige, Lean, ISO and Six Sigma.  MidwayUSA received the Malcolm Baldrige National Quality Award in 2009, 2015, and 2021. MidwayUSA is one of only eight organizations to earn the award three times since the first award cycle in 1988.  The 2015 Baldrige National Quality Award was a follow-up to MidwayUSA's receipt of the Missouri Quality Award from the Excellence in Missouri Foundation in 2015, an award the organization also received in 2008.

NRA support

Larry and Brenda Potterfield created two programs and several educational endowments in the National Rifle Association (NRA) Foundation. Brenda also served as the Vice President of the NRA Foundation's Board of Trustees. Since 1992, MidwayUSA has asked customers to round up the total of each order and donate the change to the NRA/ILA.

References

External links
 MidwayUSA
 MidwayUSA Foundation

Companies based in Columbia, Missouri
Sporting goods retailers of the United States
Online retailers of the United States
Privately held companies based in Missouri
American companies established in 1977
Retail companies established in 1977
Firearm commerce